Gamma Nu Literary Society is a literary society located on Illinois College's campus, United States.

Founded in 1897, Gamma Nu bases its strength upon literary productions, brotherhood, organization, and social activities for all of Illinois College. The "Nuers", as they are referred to, consider their bonds of brotherhood to be the strongest among the societies. This tradition is coupled with their parties, spirit, and unification for a common cause.

References 

Literary societies
Illinois College
Student organizations established in 1897
1897 establishments in Illinois